Bouchaib Belkaid (born May 23, 1967) is a Moroccan sprinter.

Belkaid finished seventh in 4 x 400 metres relay at the 1991 World Championships, together with teammates Abdelali Kasbane, Ali Dahane and Benyounés Lahlou.

External links

sports-reference

1967 births
Living people
Moroccan male sprinters
Athletes (track and field) at the 1992 Summer Olympics
Olympic athletes of Morocco
Mediterranean Games bronze medalists for Morocco
Mediterranean Games medalists in athletics
Athletes (track and field) at the 1991 Mediterranean Games